Jackie Mothatego is a footballer from Selebi-Phikwe, Botswana and is presently playing for Mochudi Centre Chiefs SC.

Career

In 2014, the forward was given a trial for Bloemfontein Celtic.
Bloemfontein Celtic F.C. confirmed that the international would not join them after evaluating him on trial over the course of January 2014. Their reason was that their foreign players limit was reached.

Failing to seal a frequent spot at Mochudi Centre Chiefs SC, he resorted to Gilport Lions recently.

International career

He was selected for the Botswana national football team in 2012-2013. In a match against Malawi, Bothatego scored the only goal.

References

Living people
1987 births
Mochudi Centre Chiefs SC players
Association football forwards
Botswana footballers
Botswana international footballers